Rūju no Dengon (ルージュの伝言, Message in Rouge, Rouge no Dengon, Lipstick Message) is the fifth single by Japanese singer-songwriter Yumi Arai, released in February 1975. This was her first single to enter the Oricon Singles Chart.

Overview
Rūju no Dengon is the lead single from the album Cobalt Hour. Its coupling song Nani mo Kikanaide was also included in the album.

The meaning of the lyrics shows a girl's actions after finding out that her boyfriend cheated. The song was used as the opening theme for the Ghibli movie Kiki's Delivery Service. Also the ending theme of the movie was Yasashisa ni Tsutsumareta Nara (album ver.) in which it was included in her studio album MISSLIM.

Tatsuro Yamashita, Minako Yoshida, Taeko Ohnuki participated on the chorus of the song. Masataka Matsutoya, who was in charge of the arrangement, said, "The members of the tour band were asked to participate in the recording once in a while, and although it was OK, the quality of the performance was inferior to usual, so there was no response. After that, I added strings, but I felt that it was 60 points, so I thought that I could not make a record as it is. Then I came up with the idea of ​​using Yamashita for the chorus. He had a connection with the chorus in the past.

After that, Yamashita gathered Yoshida, Ohnuki, and Kayo Ishū to make a chorus. That made it an outstanding American pop song. Therefore, Yamashita's power is very strong when it comes to "Rūju no Dengon". As a result, he pioneered Yumi's pop singer line.

Track listing

Chart positions

Release history

References

1975 singles
J-pop songs
1975 songs